Princess Xihai (fl. 434) was a consort of the Qilian Khan of the Rouran Khaganate. She was born into the imperial clan of the Northern Wei, and was a cousin or sister of the Emperor Taiwu.

Biography
She was married to the Rouran Khan Wuti, son of Khan Datan, of the royal Yujiulü clan. In the fourth year of Shenjia (神䴥) (431 CE), Wuti sent an envoy to the Northern Wei dynasty. In February of the third year of Yanhe
(延和) (434), Emperor Taiwu gave Princess Xihai in marriage to Wuti, and took in turn Wuti's sister Lu Zuo Zhaoyi (闾左昭仪), who would bear him Tuoba Yu, as his wife.

In popular culture
She was played by actress Wang Ou in the 2013 TV series The Story of Mulan.

Sources

References 

Rouran
Place of birth missing
5th-century Chinese women
5th-century Chinese people
Chinese princesses